Dibrachionostylus is a monotypic genus of flowering plants in the family Rubiaceae. The genus contains only one species, viz. Dibrachionostylus kaessneri, which is endemic to Kenya.

References

External links
Dibrachionostylus in the World Checklist of Rubiaceae

Monotypic Rubiaceae genera
Spermacoceae